The nomenklatura (from ) were a category of people within the Soviet Union and other Eastern Bloc countries who held various key administrative positions in the bureaucracy, running all spheres of those countries' activity: government, industry, agriculture, education, etc., whose positions were granted only with approval by the communist party of each country or region.

Virtually all members of the nomenklatura were members of a communist party. Critics of Stalin, such as Milovan Đilas, critically defined them as a "new class". Richard Pipes, a Harvard historian, claimed that the nomenklatura system mainly reflected a continuation of the old Tsarist regime, as many former Tsarist officials or "careerists" joined the Bolshevik government during and after the Russian Civil War of 1917–1922.

The nomenklatura formed a de facto elite of public powers in the former Eastern Bloc; one may compare them to the Western establishment holding or controlling both private and public powers (for example, in media, finance, trade, industry, the state and institutions).

Individuals with a nomenklatura background have continued to dominate economic and political life in Russia since the end of the Cold War. According to one 2022 estimate, 60% of elites in the Vladimir Putin regime had nomenklatura backgrounds.

Etymology
The Russian term is derived from the Latin nomenclatura, meaning a system of names.

The term was popularized in the West by the Soviet dissident Michael Voslenski, who in 1970 wrote a book titled Nomenklatura: The Soviet Ruling Class.

Description

The nomenklatura referred to the Communist Party's governance to make appointments to key positions throughout the governmental system, as well as throughout the party's own hierarchy. Specifically, the nomenklatura consisted of two separate lists: one was for key positions, appointments to which were made by authorities within the party; the other was for persons who were potential candidates for appointment to those positions. The Politburo, as part of its nomenklatura authority, maintained a list of ministerial and ambassadorial positions that it had the power to fill, as well as a separate list of potential candidates to occupy those positions.

Coextensive with the nomenklatura were patron-client relations. Officials who had the authority to appoint individuals to certain positions cultivated loyalties among those whom they appointed. The patron (the official making the appointment) promoted the interests of clients in return for their support. Powerful patrons, such as the members of the Politburo, had many clients. Moreover, an official could be both a client (in relation to a higher-level patron) and a patron (to other, lower-level officials).

Because a client was beholden to his patron for his position, the client was eager to please his patron by carrying out his policies. The Soviet power structure essentially consisted (according to its critics) of groups of vassals (clients) who had an overlord (the patron). The higher the patron, the more clients the patron had. Patrons protected their clients and tried to promote their careers. In return for the patron's efforts to promote their careers, the clients remained loyal to their patron. Thus, by promoting his clients' careers, the patron could advance his own power.

Party's appointment authority
The nomenklatura system arose early in Soviet history. Vladimir Lenin wrote that appointments were to take the following criteria into account: reliability, political attitude, qualifications, and administrative ability. Joseph Stalin, who was the first general secretary of the party, was also known as "Comrade File Cabinet" (Tovarishch Kartotekov) for his assiduous attention to the details of the party's appointments. Seeking to make appointments in a more systematic fashion, Stalin built the party's patronage system and used it to distribute his clients throughout the party bureaucracy.

Under Stalin's direction in 1922, the party created departments of the Central Committee and other organs at lower levels that were responsible for the registration and appointment of party officials. Known as uchraspred, these organs supervised appointments to important party posts. According to American sovietologist Seweryn Bialer, after Leonid Brezhnev's accession to power in October 1964, the party considerably expanded its appointment authority. However, in the late 1980s, some official statements indicated that the party intended to reduce its appointment authority, particularly in the area of economic management, in line with Mikhail Gorbachev's reform efforts.

At the all-union level, the Party Building and Cadre Work Department supervised party nomenklatura appointments. This department maintained records on party members throughout the country, made appointments to positions on the all-union level, and approved nomenklatura appointments on the lower levels of the hierarchy. The head of this department sometimes was a member of the Secretariat and was often a protégé of the general secretary.

Every party committee and party organizational department, from the all-union level in Moscow to the district and city levels, prepared two lists according to their needs. The basic (osnovnoi) list detailed positions in the political, administrative, economic, military, cultural, and educational bureaucracies that the committee and its department had responsibility for filling. The registered (uchetnyi) list enumerated the persons suitable for these positions.

Patron–client relations
An official in the party or government bureaucracy could not advance in the nomenklatura without the assistance of a patron. In return for this assistance in promoting his career, the client carried out the policies of the patron. Patron–client relations thus help to explain the ability of party leaders to generate widespread support for their policies. The presence of patron–client relations between party officials and officials in other bureaucracies also helped to account for the large-scale control the party exercised over the Soviet society. All of the 2 million members of the nomenklatura system understood that they held their positions only as a result of a favor bestowed on them by a superior official in the party and that they could easily be replaced if they manifested disloyalty to their patron. Self-interest dictated that members of the nomenklatura submit to the control of their patrons in the party.

Clients sometimes could attempt to supplant their patron. For example, Nikita Khrushchev, one of Lazar M. Kaganovich's former protégés, helped to oust the latter in 1957. Seven years later, Leonid Brezhnev, a client of Khrushchev, helped to remove his boss from power. The power of the general secretary was consolidated to the extent that he placed his clients in positions of power and influence. The ideal for the general secretary, writes Soviet émigré observer Michael Voslensky, "is to be overlord of vassals selected by oneself."

Several factors explain the entrenchment of patron–client relations. Firstly, in a centralized government system, promotion in the bureaucratic-political hierarchy was the only path to power. Secondly, the most important criterion for promotion in this hierarchy was approval from one's supervisors, who evaluated their subordinates on the basis of political criteria and their ability to contribute to the fulfillment of the economic plan. Thirdly, political rivalries were present at all levels of the party and state bureaucracies but were especially prevalent at the top. Power and influence decided the outcomes of these struggles, and the number and positions of one's clients were critical components of that power and influence. Fourthly, because fulfillment of the economic plan was decisive, systemic pressures led officials to conspire together and use their ties to achieve that goal.

The faction led by Brezhnev provides a good case study of patron–client relations in the Soviet system. Many members of the Brezhnev faction came from Dnipropetrovsk, where Brezhnev had served as first secretary of the provincial party organization. Andrei P. Kirilenko, a Politburo member and Central Committee secretary under Brezhnev, was first secretary of the regional committee of Dnipropetrovsk. Volodymyr Shcherbytsky, named as first secretary of the Ukrainian apparatus under Brezhnev, succeeded Kirilenko in that position. Nikolai Alexandrovich Tikhonov, appointed by Brezhnev as first deputy chairman of the Soviet Union's Council of Ministers, graduated from the Dnipropetrovsk Metallurgical Institute, and presided over the economic council of Dnipropetrovsk Oblast. Finally, Nikolai Shchelokov, minister of internal affairs under Brezhnev, was a former chairman of the Dnipropetrovsk soviet.

Patron–client relations had implications for policy making in the party and government bureaucracies. Promotion of trusted subordinates into influential positions facilitated policy formation and policy execution. A network of clients helped to ensure that a patron's policies could be carried out. In addition, patrons relied on their clients to provide an accurate flow of information on events throughout the country. This information assisted policymakers in ensuring that their programs were being implemented.

The New Class
Milovan Đilas, a critic of Stalin, wrote of the nomenklatura as the "new class" in his book The New Class: An Analysis of the Communist System, and he claimed that it was seen by ordinary citizens as a bureaucratic elite that enjoyed special privileges and had supplanted the earlier wealthy capitalist elites.

See also

Apparatchik
Bolibourgeoisie
Criticisms of communist party rule
Gerarca - similar term used in Fascist Italy
Mazhory
New Soviet man
New class
Partmaximum

References

 -

Further reading
 
Russian original was written in 1970, distributed by samizdat, and eventually printed as  Восленский М.С., Номенклатура. Господствующий класс Советского Союза. М., 1991.

Bureaucratic organization
Stereotypes of the upper class
Politics of the Soviet Union
Soviet phraseology
Eastern Bloc
Social class in Poland
Social groups of Russia
Social classes
Society of the Soviet Union